The Kamov Ka-115 Moskvichka is a light multi-purpose helicopter designed for many uses, including passenger and cargo transportation, emergency service, SAR and patrol, or charter flights.

Design and development

Development is based on extensive use of advanced technologies tested to ensure high performance and reduce operating costs. 
A full-scale mockup of the helicopter was first built to optimize the layout of technological, operational, and ergonomic features. A wind tunnel model TsAGI was created to test flight characteristics and improve aerodynamic airframe layout. Laboratories tested the air intakes' dust device to improve efficiency. A model of the Ka-115 was presented at the aerospace show MAKS-95 in Zhukovsky. Prototype's first flight was 1999 and the aircraft is in production.

The basic Ka-115 is powered by a Pratt & Whitney Canada/Klimov PW206K/2 engine that drives a coaxial rotor system, equipped with rotor de-icing. The Ka-115 features a large five-door cabin with large windows and a skid undercarriage. The cabin is fitted with vibration and noise suppression, heating and ventilation systems, and comfortable shock-absorbing crew and passenger seats.

Specifications

References

 www.airshow.ru 
 EI Ruzhitsky "Helicopters", 1997

External links

 www.aviation.ru
 www.fsdome.com
 www.skycar.co.za

1990s Soviet and Russian civil utility aircraft
Kamov aircraft
Kamov Ka-115
Aircraft first flown in 1999